

National Football League, 1926
In 1926, Laois won the first ever National Football League title beating Dublin in the final played in New Ross by 2-1 to 1-0.

Chris Miller and Jack Delaney were called into the side when Paddy Lenihan and Bill Kealy who had played in earlier games had left for the USA.

Leinster Senior Football Championship, 1946
In 1946, Laois won their fifth Leinster Senior Football Championship title, beating Kildare by 0-11 to 1-6 in the final played at Croke Park.

Laois GAA website article
Irish Times Jim Sayers interview

Leinster Under 21 Football Championship, 1964
On 2 August 1964, Laois won the first ever Leinster U21 Football Championship title, with a 1-8 to 0-8 win over their midland rivals Offaly in the final.

Laois went on to play Kerry in the All-Ireland Under-21 Football Championship final but were beaten 1-10 to 1-3 at Croke Park on 13 September.

Leinster Minor Football Championship, 1966
On 24 July 1966, Laois won their second Leinster Minor Football Championship title with a 1-10 to 0-7 win over Offaly in the final at Croke Park.

Laois went on to play Down in the All-Ireland Minor Football Championship semi-final but, after a 1-11 to 2-8 draw, Laois were beaten 3-8 to 2-4 in the replay in Navan on 28 August.

Leinster Minor Football Championship, 1967
On 30 July 1967, Laois won their third Leinster Minor Football Championship title with a 1-8 to 2-4 win over Dublin in the final in Newbridge.

Laois went on to play Cork in the All-Ireland Minor Football Championship final but were beaten by 5-14 to 2-3 at Croke Park on 24 September.

Leinster Under 21 Football Championship, 1969
On 9 August 1969, Laois won their second Leinster U21 Football Championship title with a 2-7 to 2-6 win over Wicklow in the final.

Laois went on to play Roscommon in the All-Ireland Under-21 Football Championship semi-final but were beaten 2-13 to 0-9 in Roscommon on 23 August.

Leinster Under 21 Football Championship, 1982
In 1982, Laois won their third Leinster U21 Football Championship title beating Longford by 2-11 to 0-3 in the final played in Tullamore on 18 July.

National Football League, 1986
In 1986, Laois won their second National Football League title beating Monaghan by 2-6 to 2-5 in the final played in Croke Park.

The men from the O'Moore County were the surprise team of the season coming from Division 3 to take the second highest honour in the game. Laois were the masters in the first thirty minutes leading at half-time by 2-4 to 1-1. Liam Irwin was majestic at midfield and scored four great points. John Costello was excellent his high fielding was Majestic.  Pat Brophy and Colm Browne were excellent in defence. Eamon Whelan and Willie Brennan took their goals with style. Michael Caulfield was the scorer of Monaghan's goal.

Early in the second half Martin Conroy made a wonderful save from Michael Caulfield. In the 39th minute Monaghan reduced the deficit to 3 points when Ray McCarron scored from the penalty spot after Nudie Hughes was pulled down by Martin Conroy. The O'Moore County men's defence responded magnificently to the challenge restricting the defending champions attack to just four points in the second half.

Leinster Minor Football Championship, 1998

On 2 August 1998, Laois won their sixth Leinster Minor Football Championship title with a 2-9 to 0-12 win over Dublin in the final at Croke Park.

Laois went on to play Tyrone in the All-Ireland Minor Football Championship final but were beaten at Croke Park in September.

Subs: John Graham, Colm Byrne, Pauric Phelan, Eoin Browne, Damien Walsh, Donal Miller, Mark Dunne, John Ml. McDonald, John O'Neill.

Leinster Senior Football Championship, 2003
In 2003, Laois won their sixth Leinster Senior Football Championship title beating Kildare by 2-13 to 1-13 in the final played in front of 64,800 fans at Croke Park.

References

GAA
Laois county football team title winning teams
Winning